Kawana Pitiroi Paipai (? – 11 June 1884) was a New Zealand tohunga, military leader and assessor. Of Māori descent, he identified with the Ngati Ruaka and Te Ati Haunui-a-Paparangi iwi.

References

1884 deaths
Te Āti Haunui-a-Pāpārangi people
Signatories of the Treaty of Waitangi
Tohunga
New Zealand military personnel
Year of birth unknown